James "Hap" Sharp (January 1, 1928 – May 7, 1993) was an American race car driver who drove in six Formula One Grands Prix. He was most famous however, for being a co-owner and driver of the revolutionary Chaparral sports racing cars built by Jim Hall and Sharp in Midland, Texas. In 1962 Jim Hall and Hap Sharp formed Chaparral Cars, Inc. and immediately began the design and construction of Chaparral 2, a mid-engined car with an aerospace inspired semi-monocoque fiberglass chassis.

Racing career

Sharp's record while driving for Chaparral:

1962
Road America 500, Hall and Sharp 1st - Chaparral 1

1964
USRRC Kent, Sharp 2nd - Chaparral 2
USRRC Greenwood, Sharp fastest lap - Chaparral 2
USRRC Mid-Ohio, Sharp 1st - Chaparral 2
Nassau Speed Week, Sharp/Penske 1st - Chaparral 2

1965
Sebring, Hall/Sharp fastest lap and 1st - Chaparral 2
USRRC Riverside, Sharp fastest lap and 2nd - Chaparral 2
Bridgehampton, Sharp 2nd - Chaparral 2
USRRC Watkins Glen, Sharp 2nd - Chaparral 2
FIA Mr. Tremblant, Canada, Sharp 3rd - Chaparral 2
USRRC Kent, Sharp fastest lap and 2nd - Chaparral 2
USRRC Continental Divide, CO, Sharp 1st - Chaparral 2
USRRC Mid-Ohio, Sharp 1st - Chaparral 2
Road America 500 Hall/Sharp/Hissom 1st, Hall/Sharp/Jennigs 2nd - Chaparral 2
Bridgehampton, Sharp fastest lap and 1st - Chaparral 2
Kent WA, Sharp 2nd - Chaparral 2C
Laguna Seca, Sharp fastest lap and 2nd - Chaparral 2
Riverside, Sharp 1st - Chaparral 2
Las Vegas, Sharp 1st - Chaparral 2
Nassau, Sharp 1st - Chaparral 2 (fitted with two position flipper type spoiler per the Chaparral 2C)

Sharp retired from driving after the 1965 season, with two exceptions. Sharp drove a Chaparral 2E in the 1966 Nassau Trophy race, and substituted for Mike Spence (F1 commitment) driving the Chaparral 2F in the 1967 Targa Florio.

Personal life
His nickname "Hap" came from "Happy New Year", in connection with his date of birth. He committed suicide in 1993 after being diagnosed with cancer.

Complete Formula One World Championship results 
(key)

References

External links 
 Chaparral Cars website
 Chaparral Racing Cars on Pinterest

American Formula One drivers
1928 births
1993 deaths
Sportspeople from Tulsa, Oklahoma
Racing drivers from Oklahoma
Reg Parnell Racing Formula One drivers
Rob Walker Racing Team Formula One drivers
World Sportscar Championship drivers
12 Hours of Sebring drivers